South San Francisco station is a Bay Area Rapid Transit (BART) station located in South San Francisco, California in northern San Mateo County. It consists of two main tracks and a shared underground island platform. The station forms the current northern terminus of the Centennial Way Trail.

Service at the station began on June 22, 2003 as part of the BART San Mateo County Extension project that extended BART service southward from Colma to Millbrae and San Francisco International Airport.

Bus connections

SamTrans bus routes , and  stop in the busway on the west side of the station. Route  stops on El Camino Real west of the station. Route  stops at the corner of Mission Road and Evergreen Drive on the east side of the station.

Several Commute.org local shuttle routes also serve the station. The Utah/Grand Shuttle and Genesis One Tower Place routes stop on the east busway; the Oyster Place Shuttle route stops in the west busway. The city-operated South City Shuttle Blue and Green routes also uses the east busway.

References

External links 

BART - South San Francisco

Bay Area Rapid Transit stations in San Mateo County, California
Stations on the Yellow Line (BART)
Stations on the Red Line (BART)
South San Francisco, California
Railway stations in the United States opened in 2003
Bus stations in San Mateo County, California